Neola Township is a township in Pottawattamie County, Iowa, USA.

History
Neola Township was established in 1872.

References

Townships in Pottawattamie County, Iowa
Townships in Iowa